Defending champion Jiske Griffioen defeated Aniek van Koot in the final, 6–3, 7–5 to win the women's singles wheelchair tennis title at the 2016 Australian Open.

Seeds

Draw

References 

General

 Drawsheets on ausopen.com 

Specific

Wheelchair Women's Singles
2016 Women's Singles